The following is a timeline of the COVID-19 pandemic in Ontario throughout the first half of 2022 as daily reports were replaced with weekly reports on Thursdays beginning in June 17, 2022.

Data

Timeline

January 

On January 3, the Ontario Government announced that Ontario would be moving into modified Step 2 from January 5 for a period of at least 21 days (January 26; this may be extended based on public health trends); closing indoor dining, gyms, movie theatres and schools.

February

The government announced that COVID-19 boosters would be available for youth 12 to 17 years old.

March

On March 3, Dr. Kieran Moore, Ontario's Chief Medical Officer of Health, said the actual number of COVID-19 cases in the province is likely ten times the reported figure based on limited testing.

On March 21, Ontario dropped its mask mandate for schools, restaurants, bars, gyms, and several other public settings.

April

On April 22, 2022, Ontario announced that the remaining mask mandate restrictions would be extended until June 11, 2022, due to a rising number of new cases.

May

On May 11, Ontario reported a total of 13,000 deaths. 

On May 22, Ontario reported under 1,000 hospitalizations for the first time ever since January with the province reporting 809 hospitalizations.

On May 23, Ontario reported under 1,000 cases for the first time in months with the province reporting 668 new cases.

June

On June 11, Ontario's mask requirements were lifted on public transit and hospitals.

On June 17, Ontario's Chief Medical Officer of Health Dr. Kieran Moore announced that the province would switch to weekly reporting of COVID-19 data on Thursdays, ending the practice of publishing daily reports.

References 

Ontario
Coronavirus
2022 in Ontario
Ontario